Pamela Lyndon Travers  (born Helen Lyndon Goff; 9 August 1899 – 23 April 1996) was an Australian-British writer who spent most of her career in England. She is best known for the Mary Poppins series of books, which feature the eponymous magical nanny.

Goff was born in Maryborough, Queensland, and grew up in the Australian bush before being sent to boarding school in Sydney. Her writing was first published when she was a teenager, and she also worked briefly as a professional Shakespearean actress. Upon immigrating to England at the age of 25, she took the name "Pamela Lyndon Travers" and adopted the pen name P. L. Travers in 1933 while writing the first of eight Mary Poppins books.

Travers travelled to New York City during World War II while working for the British Ministry of Information. At that time, Walt Disney contacted her about selling to Walt Disney Productions the rights for a film adaptation of Mary Poppins. After years of contact, which included visits to Travers at her home in London, Walt Disney obtained the rights and the film Mary Poppins premiered in 1964. 

In 2004, a stage musical adaptation of the books and the film opened in the West End; it premiered on Broadway in 2006. A film based on Disney's efforts to persuade Travers to sell him the Mary Poppins film rights was released in 2013, Saving Mr. Banks, in which Travers is portrayed by Emma Thompson. In a 2018 sequel to the original film, Mary Poppins Returns, Poppins, played by Emily Blunt, returns to help the Banks family once again.

Early life 
Helen Lyndon Goff, also known as Lyndon, was born on 9 August 1899 in Maryborough, Queensland, Australia, at her family's home. Her mother, Margaret Agnes Goff (née Morehead), was Australian and the niece of Boyd Dunlop Morehead, Premier of Queensland from 1888 to 1890. Her father, Travers Robert Goff, was unsuccessful as a bank manager owing to his alcoholism, and was eventually demoted to the position of bank clerk. The two had been married on 9 November 1898, nine months before Helen was born. The name Helen came from a maternal great-grandmother and great-aunt. Although she was born in Australia, Goff considered herself Irish and later expressed the sentiment that her birth had been "misplaced".

As a baby she visited her great aunt Ellie in Sydney for the first time; Ellie would figure prominently in her early life, as Goff often stayed with her. Goff lived a simple life as a child, given a penny a week by her parents as well as occasional other gifts. Her mother was known for giving Goff maxims and instructions and she loved "the memory of her father" and his stories of life in Ireland. Goff was also an avid reader, later stating that she could read at three years old, and particularly enjoying fairy tales.

The family lived in a large home in Maryborough until Lyndon was three years old, when they relocated to Brisbane in 1902. Goff recalled an idealized version of her childhood in Maryborough as an adult. In Brisbane Goff's sister was born. In mid-1905 Goff went to spend time with Ellie in Sydney. Later that year, Lyndon returned and the family moved to Allora, Queensland. In part because Goff was often left alone as a child by parents who were "caught up in their own importance", she developed a "form of self-sufficiency and [...had an] idiosyncratic form of fantasy life", according to her biographer Valerie Lawson, often pretending to be a mother henat times for hours. Goff also wrote poetry, which her family paid little attention to. In 1906 Lyndon attended the Allora Public School. Travers Goff died at home in January 1907. Lyndon would struggle to come to terms with this fact for the next six years.

Following her father's death, Goff, along with her mother and sisters, moved to Bowral, New South Wales, in 1907, and she attended the local branch of the Sydney Church of England Grammar School.  She boarded at the now-defunct Normanhurst School in Ashfield, a suburb of Sydney, from 1912. At Normanhurst, she began to love theatre. In 1914 she published an article in the Normanhurst School Magazine, her first, and later that year directed a school concert. The following year, Goff played the role of Bottom in a production of A Midsummer Night's Dream. She became a prefect and sought to have a successful career as an actress. Goff's first employment was at the Australian Gas Light Company as a cashier. In 1920 Goff appeared in her first pantomime. The following year she was hired to work in a Shakespearean Company run by Allan Wilkie based in Sydney.

Career 
Goff had her first role in the troupe as Anne Page in a March 1921 performance of The Merry Wives of Windsor. She decided to go by the stage name of "Pamela Lyndon Travers", taking Travers from her father's name and Pamela because she thought it a "pretty" name that "flowed" with Travers. Travers toured New South Wales beginning in early 1921 and returned to Wilkie's troupe in Sydney by April 1922. That month, in a review of her performance as Titania in A Midsummer Night's Dream, a critic for Frank Morton's Triad wrote that her performance was 'all too human'.

The troupe travelled to New Zealand, where Travers met and fell in love with a journalist for  The Sun. The journalist took one of Travers' poems to his editor and it was published in the Sun. Even after she left New Zealand Travers continued to submit works to the Sun, eventually having her own column called "Pamela Passes: the Sun's Sydney Letter". Travers also had work accepted and published by publications including the Shakespeare Quarterly, Vision, and The Green Room. She was told to not make a career out of journalism and turned to poetry. The Triad published "Mother Song", one of her poems, in March 1922, under the name "Pamela Young Travers". The Bulletin published Travers' poem, "Keening", on March 20, 1923, and she became a frequent contributor. In May 1923 she found employment at the Triad, where she was given the discretion to fill at least four pages of a women's sectiontitled "A Woman Hits Back"every issue. Travers wrote poetry, journalism, and prose for her section; Lawson notes that "erotic verse and coquetry" figured prominently. She published a book of poetry, Bitter Sweet.

In England 

On 9 February 1924, Travers left Australia for England, settling in London. She only revisited Australia once, in the 1960s. For four years she wrote poetry for the Irish Statesman, beginning while in Ireland in 1925 when Travers met the poet George William Russell (who wrote under the name "Æ") who, as editor of the Statesman, accepted some of her poems for publication. Through Russell, whose kindness towards younger writers was legendary, Travers met W. B. Yeats, Oliver St. John Gogarty and other Irish poets who fostered her interest in and knowledge of world mythology.

After visiting Fontainebleau in France, Travers met George Ivanovich Gurdjieff, an occultist, of whom she became a "disciple". Around the same time she was taught by Carl Gustav Jung in Switzerland. In 1931, she moved with her friend Madge Burnand from their rented flat in London to a thatched cottage in Sussex. There, in the winter of 1933, she began to write Mary Poppins. During the 1930s, Travers reviewed drama for The New English Weekly and published the book Moscow Excursion (1934). Mary Poppins was published that year with great success. Many sequels followed.

During the Second World War, Travers worked for the British Ministry of Information, spending five years in the US, publishing I Go by Sea, I Go by Land in 1941. At the invitation of her friend John Collier, the US Commissioner of Indian Affairs, Travers spent two summers living among the Navajo, Hopi and Pueblo peoples, studying their mythology and folklore. Travers moved back to England at the end of the war, where she continued writing. She moved into 50 Smith Street, Chelsea, London, which is commemorated with an English Heritage blue plaque. She returned to the US in 1965 and became writer-in-residence at Radcliffe College from 1965 to 1966 and at Smith College in 1966 and lecturing at Scripps College in 1970. She published various works and edited Parabola: the Magazine of Myth and Tradition from 1976 to her death.

Mary Poppins 
As early as 1926, Travers published a short story, "Mary Poppins and the Match Man", which introduced the nanny character of Mary Poppins and Bert the street artist. Published in London in 1934, Mary Poppins, the children's book, was Travers's first literary success. Seven sequels followed, the last in 1988, when Travers was 89.

While appearing as a guest on BBC Radio 4's radio programme Desert Island Discs in May 1977, Travers revealed that the name "M. Poppins" originated from childhood stories that she contrived for her sisters, and that she was still in possession of a book from that era with this name inscribed within. Travers's great aunt, Helen Morehead, who lived in Woollahra, Sydney, and used to say "Spit spot, into bed," is a likely inspiration for the character.

Disney version 

The musical film adaptation Mary Poppins was released by Walt Disney Pictures in 1964. Primarily based on the original 1934 novel of the same name, it also lifted elements from the 1935 sequel Mary Poppins Comes Back. The novels were loved by Disney's daughters when they were children, and Disney spent 20 years trying to purchase the film rights to Mary Poppins, which included visits to Travers at her home in London. In 1961, Travers arrived in Los Angeles on a flight from London, her first-class ticket having been paid for by Disney, and finally agreed to sell the rights, in no small part because she was financially in dire straits. Travers was an adviser in the production, but she disapproved of the Poppins character in its Disney version; with harsher aspects diluted, she felt ambivalent about the music and she so hated the use of animation that she ruled out any further adaptations of the series. She received no invitation to the film's star-studded première until she "embarrassed a Disney executive into extending one". At the after-party, she said loudly, "Well. The first thing that has to go is the animation sequence." Disney replied, "Pamela, the ship has sailed".

Travers so disliked the Disney adaptation and the way she felt she had been treated during the production that when producer Cameron Mackintosh approached her years later about making the British stage musical, she acquiesced only on conditions that British writers alone and no one from the original film production were to be directly involved. That specifically excluded the Sherman Brothers from writing additional songs for the production. However, original songs and other aspects from the 1964 film were allowed to be incorporated into the production. Those points were even stipulated in her last will and testament.

In a 1977 interview on the BBC radio programme Desert Island Discs, Travers remarked about the film, "I've seen it once or twice, and I've learned to live with it. It's glamorous and it's a good film on its own level, but I don't think it is very like my books."

Later films 
The 2013 motion picture Saving Mr. Banks is a dramatised retelling of both the working process during the planning of Mary Poppins and of Travers's early life, drawing parallels with Mary Poppins and that of the author's childhood.

In 2018, 54 years after the release of the original Mary Poppins film, a sequel was released titled Mary Poppins Returns, with Emily Blunt starring as Mary Poppins. The film is set 25 years after the events of the first film, in which Mary Poppins returns to help Jane and Michael one year after a family tragedy.

Personal life 
Travers was reluctant to share details about her personal life, saying she "most identified with Anonymous as a writer" and asked whether "biographies are of any use at all". Patricia Demers was allowed to interview her in 1988 but not to ask about her personal life.

Travers never married. Though she had numerous fleeting relationships with men throughout her life, she lived for more than a decade with Madge Burnand, daughter of Sir Francis Burnand, a playwright and the former editor of Punch. They shared a London flat from 1927 to 1934, then moved to Pound Cottage near Mayfield, East Sussex, where Travers published the first of the Mary Poppins books. Their relationship, in the words of one biographer, was "intense", but equally ambiguous.

At the age of 40, two years after moving out on her own, Travers adopted a baby boy from Ireland whom she named Camillus Travers. He was the grandchild of Joseph Hone, W. B. Yeats' first biographer, who was raising his seven grandchildren with his wife. Camillus was unaware of his true parentage or the existence of any siblings until the age of 17, when Anthony Hone, his twin brother, came to London and knocked on the door of Travers's house at 50 Smith Street, Chelsea. He had been drinking and demanded to see his brother. Travers refused and threatened to call the police. Anthony left but, soon after, following an argument with Travers, Camillus went looking for his brother and found him in a pub on King's Road. Anthony had been fostered and raised by the family of the essayist Hubert Butler in Ireland. Through Camillus, Travers had three grandchildren.

Travers was appointed Officer of the Order of the British Empire (OBE) in the 1977 New Year Honours. She died in London on 23 April 1996 at the age of 96. Although Travers never fully accepted the way the Disney film version of Mary Poppins had portrayed her nanny figure, the film did make her rich. Her estate was valued for probate in September 1996 at £2,044,708.

Travers crater 
In 2018, a crater on the planet Mercury was named in her honour.

Works

Books 

 Mary Poppins, London: Gerald Howe, 1934
 Mary Poppins Comes Back, London: L. Dickson & Thompson Ltd., 1935
 I Go By Sea, I Go By Land, London: Peter Davies, 1941
 Aunt Sass, New York: Reynal & Hitchcock, 1941
 Ah Wong, New York: Reynal & Hitchcock, 1943
 Mary Poppins Opens the Door, London: Peter Davies, 1943
 Johnny Delaney, New York: Reynal & Hitchcock, 1944
 Mary Poppins in the Park, London: Peter Davies, 1952
 Gingerbread Shop, 1952 (an adapted version of the "Mrs. Corry" chapter from Mary Poppins)
 Mr. Wigg's Birthday Party, 1952 (an adapted version of the "Laughing Gas" chapter from Mary Poppins)
 The Magic Compass, 1953 (an adapted version of the "Bad Tuesday" chapter from Mary Poppins)
 Mary Poppins From A to Z, London: Collins, 1963
 The Fox at the Manger, London: Collins, 1963
 Friend Monkey, London: Collins, 1972
 Mary Poppins in the Kitchen, New York & London: Harcourt Brace Jovanovich, 1975
 Two Pairs of Shoes, New York: Viking Press, 1980
 Mary Poppins in Cherry Tree Lane, London: Collins, 1982
 Mary Poppins and the House Next Door, London: Collins. 1988.

Collections 

 Stories, 1952

Non-fiction 

 Moscow Excursion, New York: Reynal & Hitchcock, 1934
 George Ivanovitch Gurdjieff, Toronto: Traditional Studies Press, 1973
 About the Sleeping Beauty, London: Collins, 1975
 What the Bee Knows: Reflections on Myth, Symbol and Story, New Paltz: Codhill Press, 1989

Manuscript and pictorial sources 

 P. L. Travers - papers, ca. 1899–1988, 4.5 metres of textual material (28 boxes) - manuscript, typescript, and printed Clippings, Photographs, Objects, Drawings, State Library of New South Wales, MLMSS 5341, MLOH 62
 P. L. Travers - further papers, 1901–1991, Textual Records, Graphic Materials, Clippings, Photographs, Drawings, 2 boxes - 0.26 Meters, State Library of New South Wales MLMSS 5341 ADD-ON 2130
 P. L. Travers, four diaries, 1948–1953, Camillus Travers is the son of P. L. Travers, author of Mary Poppins. He gave these notebooks to his mother as a boy and they were used by her for recording his schooldays and their holidays spent together, as well as other events over this period, State Library of New South Wales MLMSS 7956
 Family and personal photographs collected by P.L. Travers, ca. 1891–1980, 1 portfolio (51 black and white, sepia, col. photographs, 2 photograph albums, 1 hand coloured lithograph, 17 coloured transparencies) various sizes, State Library of New South Wales PX*D 334

References

Citations 

 
 
 
 .

Further reading 

 Cesare Catà, La sapienza segreta di Pamela L. Travers, saggio introduttivo a La sapienza segreta delle api, Liberilibri, Macerata, 2019
 
 , 12 vol.; reprinted in International Gurdjieff Review 3.1 (Fall 1999), In Memoriam: An Introduction to Gurdjieff

External links 

 
 
 
 .

1899 births
1996 deaths
Australian women children's writers
Australian women novelists
Australian fantasy writers
Australian women poets
Australian stage actresses
British children's writers
British fantasy writers
English women novelists
British women children's writers
English women poets
Australian Officers of the Order of the British Empire
People from Maryborough, Queensland
People from Bowral
Writers from London
Writers from Queensland
Mary Poppins
20th-century English novelists
20th-century English women writers
Australian emigrants to the United Kingdom
Australian people of Irish descent
20th-century Australian novelists
Women science fiction and fantasy writers
Students of George Gurdjieff